Gamawa is a Local Government Area of Bauchi State, Nigeria, bordering Yobe State in the east. Its headquarters are in the town of Gamawa.
 
It has an area of 2,925 km and a population of 286,388 at the 2006 census.

The predominant ethnic group in the area are the Hausa, Fulani People Fulfulde with the Kare living in the east.

The postal code of the area is 752.

References

Gamawa is boarded to the south by Dambam

Local Government Areas in Bauchi State